Bachelor Party Vegas is a 2006 American direct-to-video comedy film written and directed by Eric Bernt in his directorial debut. It stars Kal Penn, Jonathan Bennett, Charlie Spiller, Diora Baird and Donald Faison. In was released by Sony Pictures Home Entertainment in the United States on April 25, 2006. In Australia and the UK, it was released under the title Vegas Baby.

Plot
Z-Bob, Ash, Eli and Johnny are a group of four guys who take their soon-to-be married best friend Nathan on a memorable trip to Las Vegas. In order to properly bid farewell to their best friend's life as a single man, they must send him out in style with an extravagant bachelor party in Sin City.

Limousines, paint ball, strippers, sex toys, alcohol, debauchery and gambling are on the agenda until they discover that Mr. Kidd, their bachelor party planner, is a bank robber planning to heist the casino, setting off a chain of events that turns their night into a living hell. Running away from the police, the casino security, and murderous Hell's Angels, the five friends are falsely accused of robbing a casino, stalked by a porn star's prize-fighter boyfriend, mugged by a female Elvis impersonator, arrested, thrown in jail, and survive many other misadventures, until finally, it seems that their own deaths are in the cards.

Cast
 Kal Penn as "Z-Bob"
 Jonathan Bennett as Nathan
 Donald Faison as Ash
 Charlie Talbert as Johnny C. MacElroy
 Aaron Himelstein as Eli
 Vincent Pastore as Carmine / Mr. Kidd
 Chuck Liddell as himself
 Marisa Petroro as The Showgirl
 Lin Shaye as Cassandra
 Graham Beckel as Officer Stone
 Diane Klimaszewski as Chrissy
 Elaine Klimaszewski as Missy
 Brent Briscoe as Mel "Big Gut Mel"
 Jaime Pressly as herself
 Daniel Stern as Harry Hard
 Diora Baird as Penelope
 Lindsay Hollister as Bachelorette
 Lester "Rasta" Speight as "Gold Tooth"
 Steve Hytner as Airport Security
 Andrew Bryniarski as Security Beast
 David Z. Chesnoff as UFC Biker #1
 Mayor Oscar Goodman as himself
 Tamara Whelan as Candy Juggs
 Sophia Rossi as Porn Star
 Kathy Griffin as She-Elvis (uncredited cameo)

References

External links
 
 
 
 

2006 films
2006 comedy films
2006 directorial debut films
2006 direct-to-video films
2000s adventure comedy films
American adventure comedy films
Direct-to-video adventure films
Direct-to-video comedy films
Films set in the Las Vegas Valley
Sony Pictures direct-to-video films
2000s English-language films
2000s American films